above&beyond, which runs under the byline "Canada's Arctic Journal", is a Canadian magazine that features northern-related lifestyle and news features. Published six times a year, the publication is also the official in-flight magazine of First Air.

History and profile
above&beyond was established in 1988. The first issue of the magazine appeared in January 1989, It has focused on various facets of northern life, including its wildlife, people, social situation, and unique geography.

References

External links
above&beyond

1988 establishments in Canada
Bi-monthly magazines published in Canada
Inflight magazines
Lifestyle magazines published in Canada
Magazines established in 1988
Mass media in Yellowknife